Köln or Cologne is the fourth largest city in Germany.

Köln or KOLN may also refer to:

Places 
Electorate of Cologne, a state and electorate until 1803
Free Imperial City of Cologne

German navy ships
SMS Cöln (1909) (1911–1914), a Kolberg-class light cruiser
SMS Cöln (1916) (1918–1919), a Cöln-class light cruiser
German cruiser Köln (1930–1945), a Königsberg-class light cruiser
Köln (1961–1982), an F120 Köln-class frigate
German frigate Köln (F211) (1984–2012), an F122 Bremen-class frigate

Music
Köln (Last Exit album), 1990
Köln (Marshall Gilkes album)
The Köln Concert (Keith Jarrett album)

Television
KOLN, a TV station in Lincoln, Nebraska, United States

See also
Kölsch (disambiguation)
Cologne (disambiguation)